The 1925 Akron Pros season was their sixth in the league and last season before becoming the Indians. The team improved on their previous output of 2–6, winning four games. They finished sixth in the league.

Schedule

Standings

References

Akron Pros seasons
Akron Pros
Akron Pros